Barshamay (Kaitag: Баршшамагӏи; Dargwa: Баршамагӏи) is a rural locality (a selo) and the administrative centre of Barshamaysky Selsoviet, Kaytagsky District, Republic of Dagestan, Russia. The population was 2,110 as of 2010. There are 24 streets.

Geography
Barshamay is located 6 km southeast of Madzhalis (the district's administrative centre) by road. Madzhalis and Kartalay are the nearest rural localities.

Famous residents 
 Sultan Alisultanov (Hero of the Soviet Union)

References 

Rural localities in Kaytagsky District